Ardian Mema (born 16 November 1971 in Tirana) is a former Albanian football player and coach. He played for KF Tirana 1989 and 2003 and has managed both the senior team and the reserves in 2007 and 2013 respectively.

Playing career

Club
Ardian was born into the prominent Mema footballing family, as his dad was former KF Tirana and Albania international Ali Mema and his uncles Haxhi and Osman were both professional footballers too. His cousin Sulejman was also a footballer and former KF Tirana player, as was Klevi Mema who died at the age of 19. He joined the senior team of KF Tirana in 1989 in the same year he began his further education at the Academy of Physical and Sports Education Vojo Kushi, where he graduated in 1993. He retired in 2003 from a 14-year career with KF Tirana where he won 6 league titles, 5 Albanian Cups and 4 Albanian Supercups, as well as being in the team of the year in 5 consecutive seasons at the heigh of his career in the 90s.

International
He made his debut for Albania in an April 1995 European Championship qualification match against Georgia and earned a total of 8 caps, scoring no goals. His final international was a February 1998 friendly match against Latvia.

Managerial career
Following his retirement Mema went into management and became the assistant coach of KF Tirana in 2007, where he was also an interim manager for one game in 2007 before the arrival of Astrit Hafizi. He then managed the Ali Dema futsal team before going on to manage the Albania national under 17 team for two and a half years in 2009. He was also instrumental in setting up the KF Tirana B team in 2013, where he was also their first manager before stepping down to become the director of the KF Tirana academy, a post which he still holds.

Managerial statistics

Honours

Player
Tirana
Albanian Superliga: 1988–89, 1994–95, 1995–96,1998–99, 1999–00, 2002–03
Albanian Cup: 1993–94, 1995–96,1998–99, 2000–01, 2001–02
Albanian Supercup: 1994, 2000, 2002, 2003

Manager
Runners-up (1) Albanian Cup 2018–19

References

1971 births
Living people
Footballers from Tirana
Albanian footballers
Association football midfielders
Albania international footballers
KF Tirana players
FK Partizani Tirana players
Albanian football managers
KF Tirana managers
Kategoria Superiore managers